"Rari WorkOut" is a single by English grime MC Lethal Bizzle, featuring vocals from Jme and Tempa T. It was released on 31 August 2014 for digital download in the United Kingdom. The song has peaked at number 11 on the UK Singles Chart.

Track listing

Chart performance

Weekly charts

Certifications

Release history

References

2014 singles
2014 songs
Jme (musician) songs
Lethal Bizzle songs
Songs written by Lethal Bizzle
Songs written by Diztortion